Hamburg is an unincorporated community in Page County in the U.S. state of Virginia. For a time, Herbert Barbee's studio was located there.

Fort Egypt and Mauck's Meetinghouse are listed on the National Register of Historic Places.

References

Unincorporated communities in Virginia
Unincorporated communities in Page County, Virginia